Martin Lloyd-Evans (born 14 April 1963) is a British opera stage director. He grew up in Stratford Upon Avon and later moved and studied physics at Manchester University  and theatre arts at Bretton Hall College.

Work
Lloyd-Evans has directed operas including I gioielli della Madonna, Un Ballo in Maschera, La Gioconda, The Queen of Spades, Andrea Chenier, Gianni Schicchi, Le Nozze di Figaro, Stiffelio, L'amore dei tre re, Don Giovanni, Mitridate, Re di Ponto, Cosi fan tutte, A Midsummer Night’s Dream, The Rape of Lucretia, Postcard from Morocco, The Beggar’s Opera, La Bohème, Cenerentola, Carmen, The Barber of Seville, Cosi fan tutte and Romeo et Juliettefor opera companies such as Opera Holland Park, Buxton Festival, Essential Scottish Opera, Mid Wales Opera, Operosa and Classical Opera Company  at Sadler's Wells Theatre. Together with fellow artists composer Jonny Pilcher and performer Andrew Dawson, Lloyd-Evans also developed the piece The Articulate Hand,  which was featured on  TEDMED. Along with his work as stage director, he is a resident producer at the Guildhall School of Music and Drama.

References

External links
 Official web site
 Thearticulatehand.com
 Tedmed.com
 Operabase.com
 Operosa.org

British opera directors
1963 births
Living people